Horace William Strutt,  (19 December 1903 – 5 November 1985) was an Australian Army officer and politician.

He was born in Hobart. He was elected to the Tasmanian House of Assembly in 1946 as a Liberal member for Denison. On 13 April 1955 he was elected Speaker of the House, serving until 28 October 1956. He lost his seat at the election held in May 1959 but returned to the House on 4 December that year in a recount following the death of Sir Archibald Park. He was defeated again in 1969.

References

1903 births
1985 deaths
20th-century Australian politicians
Australian brigadiers
Australian Companions of the Distinguished Service Order
Australian military personnel of World War II
Liberal Party of Australia members of the Parliament of Tasmania
Members of the Tasmanian House of Assembly
Politicians from Hobart
Speakers of the Tasmanian House of Assembly